John A. DeFrancisco (born October 16, 1946) is an attorney and Republican politician who formerly represented District 50 in the New York State Senate from 1993 to 2018. Senate District 50 comprises Skaneateles, Pompey, Van Buren, most of Onondaga County, and the western half of Syracuse, among other communities located in Upstate New York.

Early life, education, and military service
John DeFrancisco graduated from Christian Brothers Academy in Syracuse, New York. DeFrancisco received his Bachelor's Degree from Syracuse University, where he played college baseball, and later graduated from Duke University Law School. He is a veteran of the United States Air Force, where he served as a Judge Advocate.

Political career
First elected to the Senate in 1992, DeFrancisco previously spent eleven years on the Syracuse Common Council as both a Councilor-at-large and then the Council President. He has also served in the past as the President of the Syracuse City School District Board of Education and the Vice-President of the Conference of Large City Boards of Education. He was also of counsel at the law firm of DeFrancisco and Falgiatano; an associate with the law firm of Simpson, Thatcher and Bartlett; a Judge Advocate in the United States Air Force; and the Assistant District Attorney in Onondaga County from 1975 until 1977.

The Albany Times Union has described DeFrancisco as "an outspoken lawmaker and attorney known for his skills in floor debates. In 2010, after Republicans had lost their majority status in the Senate, DeFrancisco was "appointed chief interrogator for the Senate Republican Conference with carte blanche to grill Democrats and spotlight their flaws." A former Chair of the Senate Judiciary Committee and the Senate Finance Committee, Sen. DeFrancisco "authored the legislation that led to the implementation of the Amber Alert system" and secured state funding for a "cord blood bank [in Syracuse] that will transform medical waste into life-saving treatments." DeFrancisco opposes public financing of political campaigns, and has voted against medical marijuana legislation, the DREAM Act, and the gun control law known as the NY SAFE Act. DeFrancisco also voted against allowing same-sex marriage in New York during Senate roll-call for the 2011 Marriage Equality Act, which the Senate narrowly passed 33-29.

In 2015, following the resignation of Dean Skelos as Senate Majority Leader, DeFrancisco sought to succeed him in that post; however, Senate Republicans chose John J. Flanagan. Sen. DeFrancisco was elevated to his current post as Senate Deputy Majority Leader in July 2015.

In 2011, DeFrancisco supported legislation that would increase medical malpractice legal fees; at the time, he was still practicing law at a firm that specialized in medical malpractice.  Common Cause/New York, a good government group, accused DeFrancisco of acting in his own self-interest.

On January 30, 2018, DeFrancisco announced that he was running for the Republican nomination for Governor of New York; he stated that "'enough is enough.'" On April 25, 2018, he conceded the race to Marcus Molinaro; while he considered Molinaro an inferior candidate and was disappointed by some endorsers abandoning his campaign for Molinaro's, DeFrancisco refused to divide the party with a primary battle. He nonetheless refused to endorse Molinaro, instead endorsing Stephanie Miner, a Democrat running against Cuomo on a third-party line. On April 26, DeFrancisco announced that he would not seek re-election to the Senate in November.

Personal life
DeFrancisco and his wife, Linda, have three children and eight grandchildren. They reside in DeWitt, New York. DeFrancisco plays the saxophone; according to Russ Tarby of Syracuse New Times, he "blows a mean sax on Night Train." He is a Roman Catholic.

Notes

1946 births
Living people
21st-century American politicians
Candidates in the 2018 United States elections
Duke University School of Law alumni
Republican Party New York (state) state senators
Politicians from Syracuse, New York
Syracuse Orangemen baseball players
Syracuse University alumni
Lawyers from Syracuse, New York